Rozhyshche (Rozhishch) is a town in Volyn Oblast, Ukraine. It serves as an administrative center of Rozhyshche urban hromada. Population:

History
It was a settlement in Lutsky Uyezd in Volhynian Governorate of the Russian Empire.

During the Second World War Axis forces occupied Rozhyshche in June 1941.

A local newspaper is published here since January 1945.

In January 1989 the population was 14 391 people. Town since August 1989.

Gallery

References

Cities in Volyn Oblast
Volhynian Voivodeship (1569–1795)
Volhynian Governorate
Wołyń Voivodeship (1921–1939)
Cities of district significance in Ukraine